The Besputa is a small river in the Moscow and Tula Oblasts, Russia. It is a right tributary of the Oka.

References

Rivers of Moscow Oblast
Rivers of Tula Oblast